Watertown Township may refer to the following places:

 Watertown Township, Clinton County, Michigan (Watertown Charter Township, Michigan)
 Watertown Township, Sanilac County, Michigan
 Watertown Township, Tuscola County, Michigan
 Watertown Township, Carver County, Minnesota
 Watertown Township, Washington County, Ohio

See also

Watertown (disambiguation)

Township name disambiguation pages